Ellery Queen's Penthouse Mystery is a 1941 American mystery film directed by James P. Hogan and written by Eric Taylor. It is based on the 1939 play The Three Scratches by Ellery Queen. The film stars Ralph Bellamy, Margaret Lindsay, Charley Grapewin, Anna May Wong, James Burke and Eduardo Ciannelli. The film was released on March 24, 1941, by Columbia Pictures.

Plot

Cast          
Ralph Bellamy as Ellery Queen
Margaret Lindsay as Nikki Porter
Charley Grapewin as Inspector Queen
Anna May Wong as Lois Ling
James Burke as Sergeant Velie
Eduardo Ciannelli as Count Brett 
Frank Albertson as Sanders
Ann Doran as Sheila Cobb
Noel Madison as Gordon Cobb
Charles Lane as Doc Prouty
Russell Hicks as Walsh
Tom Dugan as McGrath
Mantan Moreland as Roy
Theodore von Eltz as Jim Ritter

References

External links
 

1941 films
1940s English-language films
American mystery films
1941 mystery films
Columbia Pictures films
Films directed by James Patrick Hogan
American black-and-white films
1940s American films
Ellery Queen films